Jaleleddin Farsi is an Iranian former politician who served as a member of the parliament from 1984 to 1988. He was also elected to the 73-man Assembly of Experts for Constitution responsible for drafting the constitution in 1979.

Farsi belonged to the Islamic Republican Party's radical faction and was its candidate for president in the 1980 election, however he was replaced by Hassan Habibi after his Afghan origin was revealed (according to Article 115 of the constitution, president must be an Iranian citizen with Iranian origin).

Before the Iranian Revolution, Farsi was trained in guerilla techniques in Lebanon. He was a senior Islamic Coalition member and maintained ties to Fada'iyan-e Islam.

Murder case
In 1992, Farsi killed a farmer in Taleqan during an argument. Four years later he was reportedly sentenced to the death penalty by the court of law. The case has never been cleared up.

References
 Assembly of Experts for Constitution Profile

Year of birth missing (living people)
Living people
Islamic Republican Party politicians
People of the Iranian Revolution
Iranian people of Afghan descent
Islamic Coalition Party politicians
Members of the Assembly of Experts for Constitution